The Diocese of Azcapotzalco (Latin: Dioecesis Azcapotzalcensis) is a Latin Church ecclesiastical territory or diocese of the Catholic Church in Mexico.

History 
It was erected on 28 September 2019 with its territory having been  carved from the Archdiocese of Mexico. The diocese is a suffragan in the ecclesiastical province of the metropolitan Archdiocese of Mexico and covers 59 parishes with 850,000 Catholics.

Ordinaries 
 Adolfo Miguel Castaño Fonseca: (28 Sep 2019 Appointed–present)

References 

Azcapotzalco
Christian organizations established in 2019
Azcapotzalco
Azcapotzalco, Roman Catholic Diocese of